Thomas Bowyer may refer to:

Sir Thomas Bowyer, 1st Baronet (1586–1650), English politician
Thomas Bowyer (died 1595), MP for Midhurst
Sir Thomas Bowyer, 2nd Baronet (1609–1659) of the Bowyer baronets
Thomas Bowyer (martyr) (died 1556), one of the Stratford Martyrs during the Marian persecutions
Tommy Bowyer (footballer) (1895–1940), English footballer

See also
Bowyer (surname)